Killeen Cowpark is a medieval church and a National Monument in County Limerick, Ireland.

Location

History

Killeen Cowpark was built in the 15th century. It was in use until 1811. It was repaired in the 1930s under the direction of Canon Wall.

Church

Killeen Cowpark is an unadorned rectangular church. It has narrow windows and a turret-like belfry.

References

Religious buildings and structures in County Limerick
Archaeological sites in County Limerick
National Monuments in County Limerick
Former churches in the Republic of Ireland